Latin American Wings (LAW) was a short-lived scheduled charter airline based at Comodoro Arturo Merino Benítez International Airport in Santiago, Chile. At the time that operations were suspended, LAW flew to six destinations using Boeing 737-300 aircraft.

History 
LAW was founded by a group of lawyers; executives in the insurance company and construction industries; and pilots for Middle Eastern airlines. It was led by Andrés Dulcinelli. The consortium had invested US$3 million in the airline, which might increase to $5 million. LAW would focus on operating flights to underserved markets.

LAW operated its first flight on 27 January 2016, from Santiago to Punta Cana. Flights made a technical stop in Lima. LAW used a Boeing 737-300 aircraft belonged to fellow start-up Chilejet. The airline had planned to receive two Boeing 767-300 operated by Air New Zealand and two Boeing 757-200 operated by Icelandair. In August 2017, the CEO of the LAW had stated a plan to add up to 14 Boeing 737-300 in the next two years.

In February 2017, the Chilean government filed a complaint against LAW for possible implications related to Haitian immigrants smuggling, using the route between Santiago and Port-au-Prince to smuggle an estimate of 14,000 people.  

After only 2 years, unable to gain any significant market share against Sky Airline and the nascent JetSmart, LAW abandoned all domestic operations in January 2018. Two months later, on March 10, facing the inability to use Jorge Chávez International Airport as a technical stop effective March 15, LAW announced that it was suspending operations.

Destinations 

At the time that operations were suspended, LAW flew to the following destinations:

Fleet 
When operations were suspended, the Latin American Wings consisted of the following aircraft:

References

External links 
 

Defunct airlines of Chile
Airlines established in 2015
Airlines disestablished in 2018
Chilean companies established in 2015
2018 disestablishments in Chile
Chilean brands